Shoal Lake Water Aerodrome  is located adjacent to Shoal Lake, Manitoba, Canada.

See also
Shoal Lake Airport

References

Registered aerodromes in Manitoba
Seaplane bases in Manitoba